The men's 1500 metres event at the 2019 European Athletics Indoor Championships was held on 1 March 2019 at 11:50 (heats), and on 3 March 2019 at 20:01 (final) local time.

Medalists

Records

Results

Heats

Qualification: First 2 in each heat (Q) and the next 4 fastest (q) advance to the Final.

Final

References

2019 European Athletics Indoor Championships
1500 metres at the European Athletics Indoor Championships